Jonathan Kaplan (born November 25, 1947) is an American film producer and director. His film The Accused (1988) earned actress Jodie Foster an Oscar for Best Actress and was nominated for the Golden Bear at the 39th Berlin International Film Festival. His film Love Field (1992) earned actress Michelle Pfeiffer an Oscar nomination for Best Actress and was nominated for the Golden Bear at the 43rd Berlin International Film Festival. Kaplan received five Emmy nominations for his roles directing and producing the television series ER.

Life and career
Born in Paris, France, Kaplan is the son of film composer Sol Kaplan and actress Frances Heflin, the nephew of actor Van Heflin, and the brother of actresses Nora Heflin and Mady Kaplan.

Kaplan lived in Hollywood until 1954, when his father had to move to New York after being blacklisted.

Kaplan started his career as a child actor in the Broadway production of The Dark at the Top of the Stairs directed by Elia Kazan. He was in a 1964 off-Broadway production Rumplestillskin by Elaine May.

He earned a BA at the University of Chicago before studying film at New York University, where he was tutored by Martin Scorsese and made an award-winning short film, Stanley (1965).

Kaplan was working at the Fillmore East in New York, doing some editing on the side, when Roger Corman offered him the opportunity to direct Night Call Nurses (1972); Kaplan had been recommended by Scorsese.

Kaplan made the movie and returned to New York. It was a hit, and Corman offered him another film, The Student Teachers (1973), which he also co-wrote and co-edited.

After making The Slams (1973) for Corman's brother Gene, he directed Truck Turner (1974), which was another huge success and saw Kaplan get an offer to direct White Line Fever (1975) for Columbia, a major Hollywood studio. That movie was an even larger success but then Kaplan made what he describes as "the biggest failure of my career", Mr. Billion (1977), an attempt to launch Terence Hill to international audiences. He then went on to make the critically acclaimed Over the Edge (1979), which failed to reach large audiences.

Kaplan says at this stage the only films he was being offered was "boy meets truck boy gets truck, boy loses truck and boy gets truck again.", so he directed a series of TV movies. "I'm a director," he said. "I want to direct movies. I don't want to sit around and have fantasies or let a project go down the tubes when we can't get some star to read the script."

During the early 1980s, Kaplan directed some movies for television and many music videos, including several for John Cougar Mellencamp, and Rod Stewart's "Infatuation" in 1984. He also directed the 1983 drag racing biopic Heart Like a Wheel and the 1987 science fiction-thriller Project X.

His feature film career revived in 1988, when The Accused (1988) earned Jodie Foster her first Oscar, for Best Actress. High profile feature film directing jobs followed, including Immediate Family (1989) and Unlawful Entry (1992). His direction of Michelle Pfeiffer in Love Field (1992) garnered her a Best Actress Academy Award nomination in 1993. His final theatrical feature film was Brokedown Palace (1999). Since the 1990s, Kaplan has primarily worked as a television director.

Selected filmography

Night Call Nurses (1972)
The Student Teachers (1973)
The Slams (1973)
Truck Turner (1974)
White Line Fever (1975)
Mr. Billion (1977) 
Over the Edge (1979)
11th Victim (1979, TV movie)
The Gentleman Bandit (1981, TV movie)
Girls of the White Orchid (1983, TV movie)
Heart Like a Wheel (1983) 
Project X (1987) 
The Accused (1988)
Immediate Family (1989) 
Unlawful Entry (1992) 
Love Field (1992) 
Fallen Angels (1993, TV series)
Rebel Highway: Reform School Girl (1994, TV movie)
Bad Girls (1994) 
Picture Windows (1995, TV series)
In Cold Blood (1996, TV series) 
ER (1997, TV series)
Brokedown Palace (1999) 
Crossing Jordan (2005, TV series)
Law and Order: Special Victims Unit (2005–present, TV series)
Without a Trace (2006–2009, TV series)
Brothers and Sisters (2010, TV series)

References

External links
 
 

1947 births
American film directors
American television directors
Living people